It's a Bad, Bad, Bad, Bad World may refer to:

 It's a Bad, Bad, Bad, Bad World, an episode of Charmed
 It's a Bad Bad Bad Bad World, an episode of The New Three Stooges
 It's a Bad Bad Bad Bad World, a novel by Curtis M. Lawson